Berzosa de Lozoya is a municipality situated in the north of the autonomous community of Madrid in central Spain. It had 234 inhabitants in 2011, covers an area of 14.3 km² and a population density of 16.36people per km².

Education
There is one nursery (public) in Berzosa del Lozoya.

References

External links

Statistics institute of the Comunidad de Madrid > Ficha municipal

Municipalities in the Community of Madrid